Amaia Merino Unzueta (b. 6 December 1970, San Sebastián) is a Basque Spanish actress. Her brother, is also an actor. She has lived in Ecuador since 1993.

Biography
Amaia Merino was born in San Sebastián on 6 December 1970, but grew up in Pamplona and studied filmmaking in Madrid. She debuted as an actress with Pedro Olea's 1984 film Akelarre and Montxo Armendáriz's , then as a director with the 2013 documentary .

Citations

Living people
1970 births
Film directors from the Basque Country (autonomous community)
People from San Sebastián
Actresses from the Basque Country (autonomous community)
Basque-language actors
People from Pamplona
Spanish expatriates in Ecuador